Sandy Lake First Nation (or ᓀᑲᣞ ᓵᑲᐦᐃᑲᓃᐣᐠ, Negaw-zaaga'iganiing Nitam-Anishinaabe) is an independent Oji-Cree First Nations band government. Its registered population in June 2007 was 2,474. As of December 2015 the total registered population reached 3,034. Sandy Lake First Nation maintains an affiliation with Nishnawbe Aski Nation, as a signatory to the Treaty 5.

Sandy Lake is policed by the Nishnawbe-Aski Police Service, an Aboriginal-based service.

Reserve
The First Nation's land base is the  Sandy Lake 88 Reserve (Oji-Cree:ᓀᑲᣞ ᕌᑲᐦᐃᑲᓃᐣᐠ (Negaw-zaaga'iganiing). Within this reserve is the community of Sandy Lake, which during the mid-1900s was known as Waabitigweyaang (ᐙᐱᑎᑴᔮᐠ) which translates to White River.  Associated with the community, the Sandy Lake First Nation maintains seven neighbourhoods grouped into five districts:
 Airport / Centre
 Big Rock / Ghost Point
 Old Sawmill
 River
 Roman Catholic

Sandy Lake is serviced by a Northern Store owned by The North West Company. The community is a fly-in community, serviced by Wasaya, Superior and Perimeter Airlines, and is linked to the rest of the province by a winter ice road that travels southwest towards Deer Lake and Pikangikum, meeting Red Lake via the Nungesser Road, which is open for approximately six weeks during the winter months.

Sandy Lake's education is maintained by the Sandy Lake Board of Education, and is serviced by three schools: Thomas Fiddler Memorial Elementary School, Thomas Fiddler Memorial High School, and Washtennigun Christian School. There is also an operational Adult Learning Center, with ties to Confederation College and Lakehead University.

Clans
Five doodem are found at Sandy Lake First Nation; these five clans are the: Suckers, Pelicans, Crane, Caribou and Sturgeon.

Language
The Sandy Lake First Nation speaks the Oji-Cree language and uses a variant western Ojibwe Syllabics.

Government
The Sandy Lake First Nation governed by an elected Chief, a Deputy Chief and eight councillors.  The current Chief is Delores Kakegamic, and the Deputy Chief is Marcel Linklater. The Head Councillor is Wayne Kakepetum; the other seven Councillors are John McKay, Allan Rae, Fabian Crowe, Russell Kakepetum, Dennis Kakegamic, Yvonne- Fiddler Kakekagumick, and Darren Meekis.

In addition to the Governance Council, the Sandy Lake First Nation maintains an Elder Council to advise the Governance Council.  Working with the Governance Council, six boards carry out the Council's operations: Community Development Services, Education, Health, Housing, Radio Station, and Recreation.

Climate
Sandy Lake has a subarctic climate (Dfc) with severely cold winters and mild summers.

Transportation
Sandy Lake Airport serves the community.

Sandy Lake has the ice/winter road during the winter months for people to drive in and out of the community. It starts at the end of Nungesser Road, goes through North Spirit Lake FN and next is the junction where the road splits into two, one going to Deer Lake FN and the other coming to Sandy Lake FN.

Notable people
Aysanabee
Abe Kakepetum
Norval Morrisseau
Carl Ray

References

External links
First Nation Connectivity 

Communities in Kenora District
Nishnawbe Aski Nation
Hudson's Bay Company trading posts